A white elephant gift exchange, Yankee swap or Dirty Santa is a party game where amusing and impractical gifts are exchanged during festivities. The goal of a white elephant gift exchange is to entertain party-goers rather than to gain a genuinely valuable or highly sought-after item.

The term white elephant refers to an extravagant, impractical gift that cannot be easily disposed of. The phrase is said to come from a perspective about the historic practice of the King of Siam (now Thailand) giving rare albino elephants to courtiers who had displeased him, so that they might be ruined by the animals' upkeep costs. However, there is no actual record of the King gifting a white elephant specifically to burden the recipients, and white elephants are considered to be highly valuable and sacred in Thai culture, so much that any white elephant that is found must immediately be brought to the King according to his legal ownership. While the first use of this term remains a matter of contention among historians, one theory suggests that Ezra Cornell brought the term into the popular lexicon through his frequent social gatherings as early as 1828.

Rules 
Each participant supplies one wrapped gift, usually of similar value. The gifts are placed in a central location, and participants determine in which order (often by numbers randomly drawn prior to the start of the game) they will take turns selecting a gift. The first person opens a wrapped gift, and the turn ends. On subsequent turns, each person has the choice to either unwrap a new present or to steal another's. When a person's gift is stolen, that person can either choose another wrapped gift to open or can steal from another player. Each gift can only be stolen twice per game. The game is over when everyone has a present. At the end, the first player may, if desired, steal any gift – according to some rules, even a gift that is out of play.

See also 
 "Christmas Party", an episode of the American television show The Office, in which staff play "Yankee Swap" at an office party
 Fair item allocation
 "The White Elephant Gift Exchange", an episode of the animated television show Regular Show, in which the park workers play the game
 Secret Santa
 White elephant sale

Explanatory notes

References 

Party games